Distributive may refer to:

Distributive property, in algebra, logic and mathematics
Distributive pronoun and distributive adjective (determiner), in linguistics 
Distributive case, in linguistics
Distributive numeral, in linguistics